Basil Sydney (23 April 1894 – 10 January 1968) was an English stage and screen actor.

Career

Sydney made his name in 1915 in the London stage hit Romance by Edward Sheldon, with Broadway star Doris Keane, and he costarred with Keane in the 1920 silent film of the play. The couple married in 1918, and when Keane revived Romance in New York City in 1921, Sydney made his Broadway debut in the parts. He stayed in New York for over a decade playing classical roles such as Mercutio in Romeo and Juliet (1922), Richard Dudgeon in The Devil's Disciple (1923), the title role in Hamlet (1923), Prince Hal in Henry IV, Part I (1926), and Petruchio in Taming of the Shrew (1927). In 1937 he starred in the murder mystery Blondie White in the West End.

He made over 50 screen appearances, most memorably as Claudius in Laurence Olivier's 1948 film of Hamlet. He also appeared in classic films like Treasure Island (1950), Ivanhoe (1952), and Around the World in Eighty Days (1956), but the focus of his career was the stage on both sides of the Atlantic.

In 1946 he starred with Flora Robson in A Man About the House at the Piccadilly Theatre.

Personal life
Sydney divorced Keane in 1925. In 1929, he married actress Mary Ellis, and the couple moved to England.A Special Relationship There he concentrated more on film than on theatre work. In the 1940s, he married English film actress Joyce Howard; they had three children. 

A heavy smoker, Sydney died from pleurisy in 1968, aged 73.

Filmography

 Romance (1920) as Armstrong
 Red Hot Romance (1922) as Rowland Stone
 The Midshipmaid (1932) as Cmdr. Fosberry
 The Third Clue (1934) as Reinhardt Conway
 Dirty Work (1934) as Hugh Stafford
 The Riverside Murder (1935) as Inspector Philip Winton
 The White Lilac (1935) as Ian Mackie
 The Tunnel (1935) as Mostyn
 The Amateur Gentleman (1936) as Louis Chichester
 Rhodes of Africa (1936) as Dr. Jim Jameson
 Blind Man's Bluff (1936) as Dr. Peter Fairfax
 Crime Over London (1936) as 'Joker' Finnigan
 Talk of the Devil (1936) as Stephen Rindlay
 Accused (1936) as Eugene Roget
 The Four Just Men (1939) as Frank Snell
 Shadowed Eyes (1940) as Dr. Zander
 Spring Meeting (1941) as James
 The Farmer's Wife (1941) as Samuel Sweetland
 The Black Sheep of Whitehall (1942) as Costello
 Ships with Wings (1942) as Capt. Fairfax
 The Big Blockade (1942) as Bit Part (uncredited)
 The Next of Kin (1942) as Naval captain
 Went the Day Well? (1942) as Major Ortler
 Caesar and Cleopatra (1945) as Rufio
 Meet Me at Dawn (1947) as Georges Vermorel
 The Man Within (1947) as Sir Henry Merriman
 Jassy (1947) as Nick Helmar
 Hamlet (1948) as Claudius - The King
 The Angel with the Trumpet (1950) as Francis Alt
 Treasure Island (1950) as Captain Smollett
 The Magic Box (1951) as William Fox-Talbot
 Ivanhoe (1952) as Waldemar Fitzurse
 Salome (1953) as Pontius Pilate
 Hell Below Zero (1954) as Bland
 Star of India (1954) as King Louis XIV
 Three's Company (1954) as Dr. Graham (segment "The Surgeon's Story")
 Simba (1955) as Mr. Crawford
 The Dam Busters (1955) as Air Chief Marshal Sir Arthur Harris
 Around the World in 80 Days (1956) as Reform Club Member #2
 Sea Wife (1957) as Bulldog
 Island in the Sun (1957) as Julian Fleury
 A Question of Adultery (1958) as Sir John Loring
 John Paul Jones (1959) as Sir William Young
 The Devil's Disciple (1959) as Lawyer Hawkins
 The 3 Worlds of Gulliver (1960) as Emperor of Lilliput
 The Hands of Orlac (1960) as Maurice Seidelman
 A Story of David (1961) as King Saul

References

External links

1894 births
1968 deaths
English male stage actors
English male film actors
People from Tendring (district)
20th-century English male actors
Respiratory disease deaths in England
Infectious disease deaths in England
Deaths from pleurisy
British expatriate male actors in the United States